Thanos Konstantakopoulos (alternate spelling: Thanasis) (Greek: Θάνος Κωνσταντακόπουλος; born February 24, 1988, in Athens, Greece) is a Greek professional basketball player. He is 1.97 m (6 ft 6in) tall.

Professional career
Konstantakopoulos started his professional career with Peristeri in 2006. He has also played with Kronos, Panelefsiniakos, Marousi, Livadeia and Kymis.

On June 22, 2017, he returned to Peristeri.

References

External links

1988 births
Living people
Kymis B.C. players
Maroussi B.C. players
Panelefsiniakos B.C. players
Peristeri B.C. players
Point guards
Shooting guards
Basketball players from Athens